The mineral industry of Somalia produces small quantities of gemstones and salt. The country also has deposits of feldspar, gypsum, iron ore, copper, gold, kaolin, limestone, natural gas, quartz, silica sand, tantalum, tin, and uranium. The mineral industry makes a small contribution to Somalia’s exports and economy in general.

The collapse of the central Government and the Somali Republic in 1991 led to ambiguity over mineral rights. The governing authority of Somaliland, formerly part of the Republic, granted East African Mining Corp. Ltd. exclusive rights to explore all mineral deposits in Somaliland. The company planned to start producing gemstones and marble in the Berbera area in mid-2006.

In June 2006, Range Resources Ltd. of Australia announced that its agreement with the governing authority of Puntland (which is located in northern Somalia) that gave the company a majority interest in the rights to all mineral and mineral fuel exploration in Puntland was supported by the TFG. The agreement was previously declared to be invalid on the grounds that only the national Government had the authority to negotiate mineral rights. Range planned to farm out or form joint-venture agreements for some properties.

As of 2006, mineral production and trade data continued to be unavailable because of the lack of a functioning central Government since 1991 and the conflict that pervaded most of the country. The war forced the closure of Somalia’s cement plant and oil refinery. The Indian Ocean tsunami of December 26, 2004, disrupted salt production in Hurdiye in late 2004 and early 2005; it is unclear to what extent output has recovered.

Gemstone and salt producers appear to be artisanal and small-scale in nature. The cement plant and refinery were operated by parastatal companies prior to their closure.

References

See also
 Oil exploration in Puntland

Mining in Somalia
Economy of Somalia